Harold Gustave Francis Greenwood (15 November 1894 – 8 July 1978) was a British ice hockey player who competed in the 1928 Winter Olympics.

In 1928 he finished fourth with the British team in the Olympic tournament.

External links
profile
Harold Greenwood's profile at Sports Reference.com

1894 births
1978 deaths
Olympic ice hockey players of Great Britain
Ice hockey players at the 1928 Winter Olympics